Suwannee High School is a public high school in Live Oak, Florida. It serves grades 9-12 and is part of the Suwannee County School District.

Sports 
There are 26 athletic teams, known as the Bulldogs, in 14 sports: baseball, basketball (boys' and girls'), bowling, cheerleading, cross country, football, golf (boys' and girls'), soccer (boys' and girls'), softball, swimming, tennis, track (boys' and girls'), volleyball, and wrestling.

The varsity football team won four consecutive 3A FHSAA championships from 1987 to 1991.

The Suwannee High wrestling team has won three state championships.

Notable  people
 Andra Davis, NFL linebacker
 Sheck Exley, cave diver, was a mathematics teacher at the school. 
 Trysten Hill, NFL defensive tackle
 Kelly Jennings, NFL cornerback
 Bruce Johnson, NFL cornerback
 Dale McCullers, NFL linebacker
 Jimmy Nelson, NFL running back
 Titus O'Neil, professional wrestler currently signed with WWE and former Arena Football player
 Del Williams, NFL offensive lineman

References

External links
 Suwannee High School

Public high schools in Florida
Schools in Suwannee County, Florida
1897 establishments in Florida
Educational institutions established in 1897